Valerie Fabre (born 30 July 1966) is a French athlete who competes in compound archery. Her achievements include an individual gold medal at the 2004 European Archery Championships, multiple team medals at the World Archery Championships, stage wins at the FITA Archery World Cup in 2006, 2007 and 2008, and becoming the world number one ranked archer from July 2005 to June 2006.

References

1966 births
Living people
French female archers
World Archery Championships medalists
21st-century French women